Connor Lambert Goldson (born 18 December 1992) is an English professional footballer who plays for Scottish Premiership club Rangers. His preferred position is at centre-back, although he has also been utilised at right-back, and as a central midfielder.

He began his career at Shrewsbury Town, whom he represented in 120 competitive matches, scoring eight goals, seven coming in one season, and also spending time on loan at Cheltenham Town. In 2015, after a promotion-winning season for Shrewsbury, he signed for Brighton & Hove Albion. His career was interrupted in 2017, when a screening found that Goldson had a defect in his heart. He joined Rangers in 2018.

Career

Shrewsbury Town
Born in Wolverhampton, West Midlands, Goldson attended Thomas Telford School and was awarded his first professional contract midway through his youth scholarship with Shrewsbury Town in May 2010. He made his debut during a 5–1 away win at Lincoln City on 8 February 2011, coming on as a 69th-minute substitute for Jermaine Grandison. With captain Ian Sharps suspended, he made his full debut on 1 March, in a 3–0 home defeat to Bury, and featured sporadically the following season as Shrewsbury won promotion to League One.

He enjoyed an extended run at the end of the 2012–13 season, featuring in nine consecutive matches and scoring his first senior goal on the last day of the season against Portsmouth for a 3–2 home win. Having helped Shrewsbury secure safety in their first season in League One, Goldson signed a contract extension on 21 June 2013.

On 28 November 2013, Goldson joined Cheltenham Town on loan initially until 4 January 2014. He made his Cheltenham debut as an added-time substitute for David Noble in a 1–0 away win against Morecambe on 7 December. Although his loan was later being extended by a further month, Goldson was recalled by his parent club on 9 January 2014 due to an injury to fellow defender Darren Jones. Following his recall, Goldson was ever-present under caretaker manager Michael Jackson, although he was unable to stop Shrewsbury suffering relegation back to League Two. Despite receiving offers from Premier League clubs, Goldson signed a new two-year contract extension on 4 July 2014, having been convinced to stay by new manager Micky Mellon.

He captained Shrewsbury Town for a whole match for the first time on 12 August 2014, in a League Cup first round victory over Championship club Blackpool, in the absence of regular skipper Liam Lawrence from the starting eleven. Goldson made his 100th Football League appearance for Shrewsbury in a home match against Dagenham & Redbridge on 3 April 2015, scoring both goals in a 2–0 win.

After securing promotion back to League One with a 1–0 victory over former loan club Cheltenham Town on 25 April, it was announced the following day that Goldson had been awarded a place on the PFA League Two Team of the Year for 2014–15, along with teammate Ryan Woods. At the conclusion of the season, he also won both the supporters' Player of the season and the Players' player of the season at the club's annual awards night for 2014–15.

Goldson made his last appearance for Shrewsbury in a 1–1 away match at Bradford City on 15 August 2015, before declaring himself unfit prior to the following home match against Chesterfield three days later.

Brighton & Hove Albion
Goldson joined Brighton & Hove Albion for an undisclosed fee, signing a four-year deal on 19 August 2015. He was first included in a Seagulls squad a month later, as an unused substitute in a goalless Championship draw at his hometown club Wolverhampton Wanderers, a result which kept his team at the top of the table.

After Brighton's 2–2 draw at Derby County on 12 December, Goldson alleged racial abuse by a home fan at Pride Park, which was investigated by the police. A week later, he made his Seagulls debut, replacing the injured Uwe Hünemeier for the final half-hour of a 3–0 home loss to Middlesbrough. His first start came on 29 December, in place of the injured Gordon Greer for a 1–0 loss to Ipswich Town at the Falmer Stadium. Three days later, when Brighton hosted Wolverhampton, Goldson scored an own goal from Jordan Graham's cross in the 32nd minute, the only goal of the game.

On 4 April 2016, Goldson scored his first goal for Brighton, equalising as they came from behind to win 2–1 at Birmingham City. The Seagulls came third and qualified for the play-offs; Goldson was one of four of their players who went off injured in their 2–0 loss at Sheffield Wednesday in the semi-final first leg.

In February 2017, Goldson was discovered to have a heart defect in a screening, and was sidelined for the remainder of the season to have preventative surgery. He played his first competitive game following his return from successful surgery in December 2017, playing the full 90 minutes in a 1–0 home win against Watford on his Premier League debut. Goldson was on the fringes of Brighton's team in 2017–18, totalling only eight appearances, but scored in their 3–1 home win over Coventry City in the FA Cup fifth round on 17 February 2018.

Rangers
On 13 June 2018, Goldson signed for Scottish Premiership club Rangers on a four-year deal, becoming Steven Gerrard's sixth summer signing. He made his competitive debut for Rangers on 12 July in a 2–0 2018-19 UEFA Europa League qualifier home win against Macedonian First Football League team FK Shkupi in what was Gerrard's first competitive fixture as manager. Goldson captained Rangers on 12 August in their 2–0 win over St. Mirren at Ibrox, as regular skipper James Tavernier was on the substitutes' bench. He headed his first goal for the club as they won with ten men, and he was praised by Gerrard after the match. On 17 October 2020, he scored a double in a 2–0 away win against Celtic in the Old Firm. He signed a four year contract extension on 1 June 2022.

Career statistics

Honours
Shrewsbury Town
Football League Two runner-up: 2014–15

Brighton & Hove Albion
EFL Championship runner-up: 2016–17

Rangers
Scottish Premiership: 2020–21
Scottish Cup: 2021–22
Scottish League Cup runner-up: 2019–20
 UEFA Europa League runner-up: 2021–22

Individual
PFA Team of the Year: 2014–15 League Two

 PFA Scotland Team of the Year: 2020–21 Scottish Premiership

References

External links

Profile at the Rangers F.C. website

1992 births
Living people
Footballers from Wolverhampton
English footballers
Association football defenders
Shrewsbury Town F.C. players
Cheltenham Town F.C. players
Brighton & Hove Albion F.C. players
Rangers F.C. players
English Football League players
Premier League players
Scottish Professional Football League players
People educated at Thomas Telford School